The Bulgaria national under-17 football team represents Bulgaria in football at an under-17 age level and is controlled by the Bulgarian Football Union, the governing body for football in Bulgaria.

Competition results
 Champions   Runners-up   Third place/Semi-finals   Fourth place   Other Top Results

Balkan U-17 Championship

UEFA European U-16/U-17 Championship

FIFA U-17 World Cup

Players

Current squad
 The following players were called up for the 2023 UEFA European Under-17 Championship qualification.
 Match dates: 13–19 October 2022
 Opposition: ,  and 
Caps and goals correct as of: 11 June 2022, after the match against

Recent call-ups
The following players have also been called up to the Bulgarian squad within the last 12 months and are still available for selection.

Notes
INJ Player withdrew from the squad due to an injury.
SUS Player withdrew from the squad due to a suspension.

See also 
 Bulgaria national under-18 football team
 Bulgaria national under-19 football team
 Bulgaria national under-21 football team
 Bulgaria national football team

References

External links
Official website 

European national under-17 association football teams
Bulgaria national football team
Youth football in Bulgaria